The 2008 Florida Republican presidential primary was held on January 29, 2008, with 57 delegates at stake on a winner-take-all basis. The Republican National Committee removed half of Florida's delegates because the state committee moved its Republican primary before February 5. Arizona Senator John McCain was the winner of the primary. Third-place finisher Rudy Giuliani dropped out of the race the following day.

Campaign
Rudy Giuliani campaigned quite heavily in Florida, which he expected to use as his "launch pad" for a "strong showing" on Super Tuesday. He campaigned almost entirely in Florida, and largely ignored South Carolina and other states voting before February 5. Polls taken before the primary showed that John McCain was the slight front runner over Mitt Romney. Giuliani had been campaigning with virtually no opposition; however, following the South Carolina Republican primary, 2008, several candidates flew down to Florida to begin campaigning up to January 29 when the primary occurred.

Pre-primary polls

As of January 29, RealClearPolitics reported that the average support from polls taken in the days immediately prior to primary day placed McCain slightly in the lead with 30.7%, followed by Romney with 30.1%, Giuliani with 14.7%, Huckabee with 12.9%, and Paul with 3.6%. Fmr. Sen. Fred Thompson and Rep. Duncan Hunter, though already out of the race, still remained on the ballot in the Florida primary.

Results
On January 29, 2008, McCain prevailed in Florida's Republican presidential primary.

* Candidate dropped out of the race prior to primary.

See also
 2008 Florida Democratic presidential primary
 2008 Republican Party presidential primaries
 2008 United States presidential election in Florida

References

External links
Election Center 2008:Primary Results for Florida

Florida
2008 Florida elections
2008